Derby is a city in Sedgwick County, Kansas, United States and the largest suburb of Wichita.  As of the 2020 census, the population of the city was 25,625.

History
For many millennia, the Great Plains of North America were inhabited by Native Americans.  From the 16th century to the 18th century, the Kingdom of France claimed ownership of large parts of North America. In 1762, after the French and Indian War, France secretly ceded New France to Spain, per the Treaty of Fontainebleau.

19th century
In 1802, Spain returned most of the land to France.  In 1803, most of the land for modern day Kansas was acquired by the United States from France as part of the  Louisiana Purchase for 2.83 cents per acre.

In 1854, the Kansas Territory was organized, then in 1861 Kansas became the 34th U.S. state.  In 1867, Sedgwick County was established within the state of Kansas, which included the land for modern day Derby.

In 1870, settlers John Haufbauer and J.H. Minich built the first houses, smithies, and general stores on the site that would become Derby. In 1871, the community was named El Paso, after El Paso, Illinois, and was laid out and platted.  In 1880, the Atchison, Topeka and Santa Fe Railway changed the name of its rail station to Derby, after railroad official C.F. Derby, to avoid confusion with El Paso, Texas.

20th century
In 1903, the city incorporated with the name El Paso, but the city remained largely a rural community until after World War II.

The aviation industry had begun its growth in Wichita during the 1920s, and when the demands of the war required more airplanes, businesses such as Boeing, Cessna and Beechcraft flourished. Boeing was located a few miles north of the city, which provided a close place for workers to live. Throughout the Cold War, Boeing maintained military contracts and kept jobs nearby. In 1952, the Air Force took over Wichita Municipal Airport and founded McConnell Air Force Base between Wichita and Derby. Many airmen found homes in Derby when space on base became occupied. From 1950 to 1956, the city population grew from 432 to approximately 5000 people.

In 1956, the city name was officially changed to Derby.

Geography
Derby is located at  (37.552407, -97.261492).

Climate
The climate in this area is characterized by hot, humid summers and generally mild to cool winters.  According to the Köppen Climate Classification system, Derby has a humid subtropical climate, abbreviated "Cfa" on climate maps.

Government
Derby operates under the Mayor-Council-Manager form of government, a system that combines strong political leadership of elected officials with strong managerial experience of a professional city manager. In this form of government, Council members and the Mayor are leaders and policy makers elected to represent both their wards and the city as a whole by concentrating on policy issues that are responsive to the needs and wishes of residents. The city manager is hired by the City Council and Mayor to carry out policies, oversee City operations, and ensure that the entire city is being served. The Governing Body establishes goals and policies which the staff executes under the supervision of the city manager.
The mayor is elected by the city at large, and eight council members are elected to represent four wards. Elections are nonpartisan and held in November of odd-numbered years.

Area attractions
 Rock River Rapids Aquatic Park, opened in 2004 as Derby Aquatic Park, covers  just off Rock Road.
 The Derby Historical Museum is housed in a 1923 school building that served all 12 grades until 1952, when a separate high school was built. The museum houses thousands of historical artifacts, including an 1870 log cabin and one of the largest displayed collections of arrowheads in Kansas. Exhibits at the museum include a school room, a general store that has a collection of antique pharmaceutical items, an original two-horse covered wagon that traveled to the Derby area from North Carolina in the 1860s and so much more.
 The Derby Skate Park has a  flat deck and nine major concrete deck structures of various shapes and sizes. The other primary element of the park is a deep bowl (four feet) with varied side slopes, including ramps, stairs and rails.

Demographics

Derby is part of the Wichita, KS Metropolitan Statistical Area.

2010 census
As of the census of 2010, there were 22,158 people, 8,300 households, and 6,226 families residing in the city. The racial makeup of the city was 91.6% White, 1.9% African American, 1.0% Native American, 1.6% Asian, 0.1% Pacific Islander, 0.8% from other races, and 3.0% from two or more races. Hispanic or Latino of any race were 5.2% of the population.

There were 8,300 households, of which 38.9% had children under the age of 18 living with them, 60.5% were married couples living together, 10.6% had a female householder with no husband present, 4.0% had a male householder with no wife present, and 25.0% were non-families. 21.3% of all households were made up of individuals, and 8.3% had someone living alone who was 65 years of age or older. The average household size was 2.66 and the average family size was 3.11.

The median age in the city was 34.7 years. 28.1% of residents were under the age of 18; 8.7% were between the ages of 18 and 24; 26.3% were from 25 to 44; 25.7% were from 45 to 64; and 11.4% were 65 years of age or older. The gender makeup of the city was 48.8% male and 51.2% female.

2000 census
As of the census of 2000, there were 17,807 people, 6,196 households, and 4,969 families residing in the city. The racial makeup of the city was 94.02% White, 1.33% African American, 0.78% Native American, 1.01% Asian, 0.14% Pacific Islander, 0.94% from other races, and 1.79% from two or more races. Hispanic or Latino of any race were 2.99% of the population.

There were 6,196 households, of which 44.5% had children under the age of 18 living with them, 67.8% were married couples living together, 9.1% had a female householder with no husband present, and 19.8% were non-families. 17.6% of all households were made up of individuals, and 7.7% had someone living alone who was 65 years of age or older. The average household size was 2.85 and the average family size was 3.24.

In the city, the population was spread out, with 32.2% under the age of 18, 6.8% from 18 to 24, 29.4% from 25 to 44, 21.7% from 45 to 64, and 10.0% who were 65 years of age or older. The median age was 35 years. For every 100 females, there were 92.5 males. For every 100 females age 18 and over, there were 89.6 males.

As of 2000 the median income for a household in the city was $58,508, and the median income for a family was $66,476. Males had a median income of $47,716 versus $27,478 for females. The per capita income for the city was $22,779. About 1.4% of families and 2.1% of the population were below the poverty line, including 1.8% of those under age 18 and 2.7% of those age 65 or over.

Economy
Derby supports more than 532 businesses, ranging from modest home-based businesses to large manufacturing companies like BRG Precision Products, manufacturer of custom digital electronic clocks and emergency messaging systems, and Mid Continent Controls, manufacturer of cabin management and in-flight entertainment systems for business jets. The city's economy is strongest in construction, retail, finance/insurance/real estate, and health-care related activities. Aircraft manufacturers Spirit AeroSystems, Textron Aviation, and Bombardier Learjet provide jobs for a significant portion of the community's residents, as do Derby Public Schools and McConnell Air Force Base.

Business & Industry
Number of Businesses: 532
Sedgwick County Unemployment: 4.8% (April 2015, KS Dept of Labor)

Top 10 Taxpayers
 Derby Marketplace LC
 Wal-Mart Real Estate Business Trust
 The Greens at Derby 
 Dillons Companies 
 Kansas Gas & Electric - A Westar Energy Co. 
 Target Corp 
 Fairways at Derby, LP 
 Lowes Home Centers Inc. 
 Kohls 
 Kansas Gas Service – Division of Oneok 

Total Property Tax Rate: 135.478 mills (2015)
 City: 47.149 mills
 Sedgwick County: 29.478 mills
 USD 260 Derby Schools: 56.294 mills
 State: 1.500 mills
 El Paso Cemetery: 1.057 mills

Total Sales Tax: 8.0% ***Effective July 1, 2015***
 State Sales Tax: 6.5%
 County Sales Tax: 1.0%
 City Sales Tax: 0.5%
 No Local Income Tax

Culture
Derby is known for its lush, green landscape and 25 miles of inviting bike and walking paths. Derby offers numerous parks, some passive for relaxation and reflection, and most with playground equipment or sports facilities. Derby's most expansive park is High Park, offering lake fishing, soccer fields, softball diamonds, and winding walking paths. High Park's picturesque amphitheater is host to the community's Fourth of July celebration and the Derby BBQ Festival (second Saturday in September), which draws competitors from around the Midwest.
Derby is a community with strong ties to its neighbor, McConnell Air force Base (MAFB). Active duty airmen live in Derby, and military retirees settle in Derby due to its high quality of life, proximity to MAFB and affordability. Derby residents routinely participate in Friends of McConnell and serve as Honorary Commanders.
  
The Derby Recreation Center is an 80,000 square foot fitness facility with various amenities. The Rec Center provides amenities and activities for all ages and all skill levels, including:
 Fitness Center
 Gymnasium - Basketball Courts (3)
 Indoor Track
 Program Studios (3)
 Indoor Pool
 Racquetball Courts (2)
 Spin Room
 Locker Rooms
 Nursery w/ Outdoor Playground

The Derby Public Library resides in a 36,000 square foot facility constructed in 2009 and houses a collection of more than 100,000 items (various forms of electronic media and books). In addition to providing research and recreational materials, the library offers free Wi-Fi, public access computing, fax, notary, copy and print service.  Meeting rooms are available to the public and range from two-person study rooms to a large community room capable of seating 180 people.  The library offers year-round programming for all ages and is open to the public 7 days a week. In 2015, the Library converted a position to Event Coordinator and contracted with the city to provide scheduling and marketing of new park facilities.
The Derby Public Library partners with the City of Derby to provide the Derby Business Center. The Derby Business Center is located both, inside the library and on the library's website to facilitate access to the many electronic business resources and services available to Kansas residents. The Derby Business Center supports prospective businesses to promote job growth and encourage business development.

The Senior Center plans and coordinates activities especially designed for its patrons.  In addition to on-site activities, the center has programs for home-bound seniors, including a reassurance calling program and meals.  The center is a modern facility with a computer lab and fitness room, and provides health services and recreational and educational programming.  The Center provides opportunities for social interaction, building self-esteem, and physical and mental stimulation.
The senior Center is open to all seniors 55 and older and provides a wide array of programs and activities for the community's older residents. The Senior Center is a gathering place for seniors throughout the day. Many patrons enjoy playing cards, listening to music, walking on treadmills, eating or playing a game of pool. There are a wide variety of events that serve a variety of interests.

Getting to community attractions is fast and easy. In addition to a convenient pedestrian and bike path system, the city also offers public transportation. For a small fee, the Derby Dash provides residents curb to curb bus transportation to wherever they want to go within the city limits.  
The Derby Dash, equipped with accommodations for the special needs of the elderly and disabled, provides low-cost public transportation. This service enables persons to be less dependent on others for basic need transportation.  Destinations include local grocery stores, banks, post office, medical facilities, Senior Center, and many other locations as determined by the needs of the riders.

Media

Radio
A Top 40 (CHR) radio station KZCH is licensed to the city, but is Broadcast from Wichita.

Television
The market's primary Univision affiliate KDCU-DT is also licensed to the city, but like KZCH, is Broadcast from Wichita.

Education
The community is served by Derby USD 260 public school district. It has one high school, two middle schools, nine elementary schools.
 Derby High School (Panthers)
 Derby Middle School (Bulldogs)
 Derby North Middle School (Falcons)

USD 260 elementary schools:
 Cooper
 Derby Hills
 El Paso
 Oaklawn
 Park Hill
 Pleasantview
 Swaney
 Tanglewood
 Wineteer
 Stone Creek

Private Schools:
 St. Mary Catholic School is a Pre-K through 8th grade school.
 Faith Lutheran School is a Pre-K through 7th grade school.

Notable people

Notable individuals who were born in and/or have lived in Derby include:
 Woody Austin (1964- ), pro golfer
 Billy Campfield (1956- ), football running back
 Caitlynn French (1989- ), voice actress
 Jason Gamble (1975- ), football offensive guard
 Matt Gogel (1971- ), pro golfer
 Nick Reid (1983- ), football linebacker
 David Rickels (1989- ), mixed martial artist
 Grant Snider cartoonist
 George Teague (1971- ), football safety

References

Further reading

 Pioneers believed that El Paso (Derby) would outgrow Wichita; Wichita Beacon; June 24, 1956.

External links

 
 Derby - Directory of Public Officials
 Derby Chamber of Commerce
 Derby city map, KDOT

Cities in Kansas
Cities in Sedgwick County, Kansas
Wichita, KS Metropolitan Statistical Area
Populated places established in 1871
1871 establishments in Kansas
Kansas populated places on the Arkansas River